Sultan Muhammad Salahuddin Airport , also known as Bima Airport, is an airport located approximately  to the south of the city of Bima, on the island of Sumbawa, West Nusa Tenggara, Indonesia.

That airport was previously known as Palibelo Airport ; however, that name has since been discontinued by the IATA.

The airport is named after Sultan Muhammad Salahuddin, the last king of the Bima Sultanate.

Airlines and destinations

References

External links 
 

Airports in West Nusa Tenggara